The Eduvos - Midrand (formerly Pearson Institute of Higher Education And Midrand Graduate Institute) is a South African private higher education institution based in Midrand, Gauteng Province. It offers bachelor's degrees in commerce, information technology, law, social sciences, creative arts, communications and science. It is also offers four postgraduate qualifications - Bachelor of Arts Honours in Graphic Design, Bachelor of Science Honours In Information Technology, Bachelor of Commerce Honours in Business Management, and Masters in Psychology.

History

Midrand Graduate Institute was first known as Midrand Campus, later known as Midrand University. Established in 1989, it soon attained acceptance as a private university-level, degree-conferring institution - one of the first of its kind in southern Africa. It formed a partnership with CTI Education Group in 2006, with the opportunity to offer degrees at various remote campuses nationwide and conferred by Midrand. Qualifications are offered at 11 campuses in South Africa. Pearson Education acquired a 75% shareholding in Midrand Graduate Institute during 2011, which grew to 100% in 2013. It is now known as the Pearson Institute of Higher Education (officially using that name from 27 July 2016). As the Pearson Institute of Higher Education now has 12 campuses in South Africa, it is now simply known as the Midrand Campus (or Main Campus) of the same institution.

Accreditation and affiliations

Midrand is registered with the Department of Education (South Africa) as a Higher Education Institution (No.2001/HE07/008) in accordance with the Higher Education Act, and its bachelor's degrees are accredited by the Council on Higher Education's Higher Education Quality Committee. All of Midrand's qualifications are registered on the National Qualifications Framework by the South African Qualifications Authority. A number of qualifications are also accredited by local, international, professional, and industry bodies such as the Association of Chartered Certified Accountants in the UK. However, it is not registered with the Health Professions Council of South Africa, though it is with the Design Education Forum of Southern Africa, the Chartered Institute of Management Accountants, the Midrand Tourism Association, the Computer Society of South Africa and the Information Technology Association.

Midrand is an official licensee for tuition support of UNISA.

Management

Its Managing Director and Principal was Dr. Tom Brown. (end 2013)
Currently Dr. Dolf Steyn (end 2016). The new Campus director of Midrand is Jowilna Storm and the MD is Nhlanhla Thwala.

Research Indaba

The Research Indaba is an initiative of Midrand's Research Committee. It originated in 2008 as a mechanism to empower staff and students to engage with the research process in order to inspire them to set in motion research projects on campus. Midrand's researchers participate in national and international conferences, symposia and consortia. Research findings are published in scientific journals, the mainstream media and subject-related journals.

Language policy

Midrand's language of instruction is English. The institution's policy of inclusiveness allows access to students whose mother tongue is not English by offering specialised English language skills programmes, support and training.

Ranking

References

External links
 Midrand Graduate Institute's official website
 Midrand Graduate Institute's Facebook Page
 Midrand Graduate Institute's LinkedIn Company Page

Universities in Gauteng
Colleges in South Africa
1989 establishments in South Africa
Educational institutions established in 1989